Sulfolane (also tetramethylene sulfone, systematic name: 1λ6-thiolane-1,1-dione) is an organosulfur compound, formally a cyclic sulfone, with the formula (CH2)4SO2. It is a colorless liquid commonly used in the chemical industry as a solvent for extractive distillation and chemical reactions. Sulfolane was originally developed by the Shell Oil Company in the 1960s as a solvent to purify butadiene. Sulfolane is a polar aprotic solvent, and it is readily soluble in water.

Properties
Sulfolane is classified as a sulfone, a group of organosulfur compounds containing a sulfonyl functional group. The sulfone group is a sulfur atom doubly bonded to two oxygen atoms and singly bonded to two carbon centers. The sulfur-oxygen double bond is polar, conferring good solubility in water, while the four carbon ring provides non-polar stability. These properties allow it to be miscible in both water and hydrocarbons, resulting in its widespread use as a solvent for purifying hydrocarbon mixtures.

Synthesis
The original method developed by the Shell Oil Company was to first allow butadiene to react with sulfur dioxide via a cheletropic reaction to give sulfolene. This was then hydrogenated using Raney nickel as a catalyst to give sulfolane.

Shortly thereafter, it was discovered that both the product yield and the lifetime of the catalyst could be improved by adding hydrogen peroxide and then neutralizing to a pH of roughly 5-8 before hydrogenation. Developments have continued over the years, including in the catalysts used.  Recently, it was found that Ni-B/MgO showed superior catalytic activity to that of Raney nickel and other common catalysts that have been used in the hydrogenation of sulfolene.

Other  syntheses have also been developed, such as oxidizing tetrahydrothiophene with hydrogen peroxide.  This reaction produces tetramethylene sulfoxide, which can then be further oxidized. Because the first oxidation occurs at low temperature and the second at higher temperature, the reaction can be controlled at each stage. This gives greater freedom for the manipulation of the reaction, which can potentially lead to higher yields and purity.

Uses
Sulfolane is widely used as an industrial solvent, especially in the extraction of aromatic hydrocarbons from hydrocarbon mixtures and to purify natural gas. The first large scale commercial use of sulfolane, the sulfinol process, was first implemented by Shell Oil Company in March 1964 at the Person gas plant near Karnes City, Texas. The sulfinol process purifies natural gas by removing H2S, CO2, COS and mercaptans from natural gas with a mixture of alkanolamine and sulfolane.

Shortly after the sulfinol process was implemented, sulfolane was found to be highly effective in separating high purity aromatic compounds from hydrocarbon mixtures using liquid-liquid extraction. This process is widely used in refineries and the petrochemical industry.  Because sulfolane is one of the most efficient industrial solvents for purifying aromatics, the process operates at a relatively low solvent-to-feed ratio, making sulfolane relatively cost effective compared to similar-purpose solvents. In addition, it is selective in a range that complements distillation; where sulfolane cannot separate two compounds, distillation easily can and vice versa, keeping sulfolane units useful for a wide range of compounds with minimal additional cost.

Whereas sulfolane is highly stable and can therefore be reused many times, it does eventually degrade into acidic byproducts. A number of measures have been developed to remove these byproducts, allowing the sulfolane to be reused and increase the lifetime of a given supply.  Some methods that have been developed to regenerate spent sulfolane include vacuum and steam distillation, back extraction, adsorption, and anion-cation exchange resin columns.

Sulfolane is also added to hydrofluoric acid as a vapor suppressant, commonly for use in a refinery's alkylation unit. This "modified" hydrofluoric acid is less prone to vaporization if released in its liquid form.

As a pollutant 
Groundwater in parts of the city of North Pole, Alaska, has been contaminated with sulfolane due to pollution from a now-closed petroleum refinery. Due to this contamination, affected residents have been supplied with alternative potable water sources. Animal studies on the toxicity of sulfolane are ongoing, funded through the US federal government's National Toxicology Program. No long-term in vivio animal studies have been done, which prevents any firm conclusion as to whether sulfolane is a carcinogen, although in vitro studies have failed to demonstrate any cancerous changes in bacterial or animal cells. In animal studies, high doses of sulfolane have induced negative impacts on the central nervous system, including hyperactivity, convulsions and hypothermia; the impacts of lower doses, especially over the long-term, are still being studied.

See also
Sulfolene
Tetrahydrothiophene
Methylsulfonylmethane

References

Ge, Shaohui; Wu, Zhijie; Zhang, Minghui; Li, Wei; Tao, Keyi.Industrial & Engineering Chemistry Research,200645(7),  2229-2234, 
Sharipov, A. Kh.Russian Journal of Applied Chemistry2003,76(1),  108-113. 
Dunn, C. L.; Freitas, E. R.; Hill, E. S.; Sheeler, J. E. R., Jr.    Proc., Ann. Conv. Nat. Gas Processors Assoc. Am.,Tech. Papers1965,44  55-8
Broughton, Donald B.; Asselin, George F.    UOP Process Div.,  Universal Oil Prod. Co.,  Des Plaines, IL, USA.    World Petrol. Congr., Proc., 7th1968,  Meeting Date 1967,4  65-73.  Publisher: Elsevier Publ. Co. Ltd.,  Barking, Engl 
Lal, Raj Kumar Jagadamba; Bhat, Sodankoor Garadi Thirumaleshwara.  (Indian Petrochemicals Corp. Ltd., India).    Eur. Pat. Appl.  1989-308019  (1991)
Van der Wiel, A.Nature1960,187  142-3.
Block, E.Reactions of Organosulfur Compounds; Academic: New York, 1978
Belen'kii, L.I.Chemistry of Organosulfur Compounds; Horwood: New York, 1990

External links
 Calculation of vapor pressure, liquid density, dynamic liquid viscosity, surface tension of sulfolane
Typical Properties of High Purity Sulfolane
Sulfolane: A Versatile Dipolar Aprotic Solvent (1 of 4), sponsored by Novasol
A Continuous Protodecarboxylation of Heteroaromatic Carboxylic Acids in Sulfolane (2 of 4), article sponsored by Novasol

Solvents
Sulfones
Sulfur heterocycles
Heterocyclic compounds with 1 ring